Juncus ranarius is a species of flowering plant belonging to the rush family Juncaceae.

Its native range is Greenland, Subarctic and Temperate Eurasia, Northwestern Africa.

References

ranarius